Mach 10 or variation, may refer to:

 Mach number for ten times the speed of sound
 Hypersonic speed of 10 times the speed of sound
 Mach 10 Training Systems, a coaching consultancy of James McCallum (cyclist)
 "Mach 10" (song), a 2007 song by Dub Pistols off the album Speakers and Tweeters
 MachTen, a Unix-like operating system based on BSD and the Mach microkernel
 Mach-X, a comic book superhero alter-ego of Marvel Comics character Abner Jenkins
 machx, a mountain biking trail in Pantperthog

See also

 Mac-10, rapper Phillip Allen; see Totally Insane
 MAC-10 submachine gun
 Mach (disambiguation)
 Mack 10 (born 1971), rapper Dedrick D'Mon Rolison
 Macx (disambiguation)